The Tag-Along: The Devil Fish (Mandarin: 人面魚: 紅衣小女孩外傳) is a 2018 Taiwanese horror film directed by David Chuang. It is a prequel to The Tag-Along (2015) and The Tag-Along 2 (2017). The film stars Vivian Hsu, Cheng Jen-shuo. The film had its world premiere at the 55th Golden Horse Film Festival and Awards. It was released  on November 23, 2018.

Plot 
The movie is based on another famous Taiwanese urban legend, a ghost story that involved three men catching and grilling a fish in central Taiwan only to notice a face appear as they began to eat it. They then heard a voice ask them, in Taiwanese, 「魚肉好吃嗎？」 ("Is the fish meat tasty?").

The story of 人面魚 (fish with a person's face) is a well known folktale in Taiwan. Tales of a fish-like creature with a human face, similar in a way to Japanese yokai, has existed in Taiwan for decades. The film introduces the same folktale of the three men catching the fish and hearing the famous sentence at the start, then the plot then follows the efforts of a group of people, involving a temple priest, a young boy and the boy's mother as they are harassed by malicious spirits brought on by the caught fish.

After completing the Tag Along story, the creators of the film wanted to make a movie about another Taiwanese folk tale, choosing the Devil Fish, potentially starting a series in which they could cover more Taiwanese urban legends in the future. The film is also set before the events of 紅衣小女孩2 (The Tag Along 2), including the young son of the Tiger Temple priest and his grandfather who both appear in The Tag Along 2 working at the Tiger Temple, with the son being the boyfriend of a missing girl in the story.

Cast

Main-starring
 Vivian Hsu as Huang Ya-Hui
 Cheng Jen-shuo as Lin Chi-Cheng
 Wu Zhi-xuan as Chia-Hao (Juvenile)
 Joe Chang as Chung
 Francesca Kao as Lin Mei-Hua
 Lung Shao-hua as Aron
 Tsai Wu-hsiung as Hung Wen-Hsiung
 Wu Hung-hsiu as Hei-Gou 
 Kuan Ming-tso as Fatty
 Chen Shao-Hui as Lin Chun-Kai
 Belle Hsin as Mei Ling 
 Chou Ming-yu as Chia-Hao's father
 Hsu Li-Yun as	old grandma
 Wang Hsin-Jue as Ah-Di
 Mitsue Kagota	as	Chia-Hao's Father's girlfriend

Guest-starring
 Rainie Yang 	
 Hsu Wei-ning
 River Huang
 Ruby Chan

See also
 Mo-sin-a

References

External links
 
 

Taiwanese-language films
2018 horror films
Taiwanese horror films
Taiwanese sequel films
2010s Mandarin-language films